is a Japanese volleyball player and Olympic champion.

She was a major player to help Japanese women's national volleyball team to dominate the World in 1962-67 by winning 1962 FIVB Women's World Championship, 1964 Tokyo Olympic Games and 1967 FIVB Women's World Championship in row.

References

External links
 Video of the moments of victory and of awarding gold medal in 1964 Tokyo Olympics

1945 births
Living people
Japanese women's volleyball players
Olympic volleyball players of Japan
Volleyball players at the 1964 Summer Olympics
Olympic gold medalists for Japan
Olympic medalists in volleyball
Medalists at the 1964 Summer Olympics